La Portellada is a municipality in the Matarraña/Matarranya comarca, province of Teruel, Aragon, Spain. According to the 2004 census (INE), the municipality has a population of 277 inhabitants.

Geography

Bordering localities 
 La Fresneda
 Ráfales
 Fórnoles
 Valderrobres

Economy 
 Agriculture
 Olive trees, olive oil is a major source of income for this town, the oil belongs to the Denomination of Origin Aragon.
 Almonds are another source of income.
 Cereal 
 Livestock
 Swine 
 Sheep and goats 
 Rabbits 
 Fowl

Monuments

Religious sites 
 Church of Saints Cosmas and Damian
 Chapel of San Miguel (recreation area)
 Piton de San Pedro Martir
 Virgen del Portillo

Industrial Architecture 
 Former "Waterfall mill" (Molí del Salt)

Landforms 
 "The Waterfall" (El Salt). A waterfall in the Tastavins river, about 20 feet high.

Other 
 "Gavella Pi" (Pine Gavella)
 "Torreta de Ferro" (Iron Tower)

Celebrations 
 Major
 Celebrations in Honor of San Cosme and San Damian on September 27, and San Miguel on September 29th
 Minor
 San Anton January 17
 St. Agatha on February 5
 San Pedro Mártir April 29
 First Easter (Easter Monday)
 Second Passover

Typical products 
 Olives of the Portellada 
 Cured ham (D.O. Jamón de Teruel)
 Casquetes
 Almonds
  (cake with chunks of marinated beef), typical of Easter

References 

Municipalities in the Province of Teruel
Matarraña/Matarranya